Gorokhovskoye is a rural locality (a village) in Yurochenskoye Rural Settlement, Sheksninsky District, Vologda Oblast, Russia. The population was 18 as of 2002.

Geography 
Gorokhovskoye is located 19 km south of Sheksna (the district's administrative centre) by road. Sobolevo is the nearest rural locality.

References 

Rural localities in Sheksninsky District